Azaspirodecane is a chemical compound.

It is the core structure of the azaspirodecanedione moiety found in some of the azapirones.

See also 
 Azaspirodecanedione
 Azapirone

Azapirones
Cyclopentanes